Bangchon Station is a station of the Daegu Subway Line 1 in Bangchon-dong, Dong District, Daegu, South Korea. It has train service until midnight.

References

External links 
 
 DTRO virtual station 

Dong District, Daegu
Daegu Metro stations
Railway stations opened in 1998